USNS Seay (T-AKR-302) is a Bob Hope-class roll on roll off vehicle cargo ship of the United States Navy. She is named after Sergeant William W. Seay, who received the Medal of Honor for heroism during the Vietnam War.

She was built by Northrop Grumman Ship Systems, New Orleans and delivered to the Navy on the 28th of March 2000. They assigned her to the United States Department of Defense's Military Sealift Command.

Seay has served in transportation efforts in both the Iraq and Afghanistan wars, mainly shuttling material between the mainland United States and European bases controlled by the US.

Further reading

 USNS William Seay USNS unofficial site
 USNS Seay Navysource online site
 US navy article on ship supporting a joint exercise

Bob Hope-class vehicle cargo ships
Auxiliary ships of the United States
1998 ships
Ships built in New Orleans